William Cawley (1602 – January 1667) was a regicide and seventeenth century English politician. He was born in Chichester in 1602, the son of John Cawley, a wealthy brewer, and was educated at Chichester Grammar School, Oxford University and Gray's Inn.

In 1625, he provided funds for the erection of almshouses on the east side of New Broyle Road. They were intended to provide homes for twelve decayed tradesmen of Chichester. By 1681, there is reference to the use of the building as a workhouse.

Cawley was elected Member of Parliament for Chichester in 1628 and for Midhurst in 1640. In 1649, Cawley was appointed to the High Court of Justice and after attending all the sittings in Westminster Hall signed  King Charles I's death warrant. He was appointed to several standing committees including the army committee, the committee for the advance of money, the committee for plundered ministers, and the committee for compounding.

Cawley was elected to the Council of State in 1651 and again in 1652.

After the Restoration of King Charles II in 1660, Cawley was exempted from pardon and fled abroad first to the Netherlands and then to Switzerland, where he joined fellow regicides Edmund Ludlow and Nicholas Love. Willam Cawley died in Vevey, Switzerland in 1667.

He married firstly Catherine Walrond and had four children, including William Cawley MP and John Cawley, Archdeacon of Lincoln. His second wife was called Mary.

References

1602 births
1667 deaths
Regicides of Charles I
English MPs 1628–1629
English MPs 1640–1648
People educated at The Prebendal School
Alumni of the University of Oxford